Kalka is a town in the Panchkula district of Haryana, India. It is near Panchkula city. The name of the town is derived from the Hindu goddess Kali. It is situated in the foothills of the Himalayas and is a gateway to the neighbouring state of Himachal Pradesh. It is on the National Highway 22 between Chandigarh and Shimla, and it is the terminus of the Kalka-Shimla Railway. To the south of Kalka is Pinjore, and the industrial village of Parwanoo (Himachal Pradesh) is to the north on the NH 22. Railways and Industrial development has led to a continuous urban belt from Pinjore to Parwanoo, but Kalka gained major economic benefits due to only highway until 2010, shimla.  It is the tehsil of 253 nearby sub villages. Nearby is Chandimandir Cantonment, where the Western Command of the Indian army is based. In 2013, the municipal committee of Kalka was dissolved and the administration was reassigned to Panchkula Municipal Corporation.

History
The town takes its name from Kalika maa the ruling deity. Kalka was acquired by British India from the Princely state of Patiala in 1843 as a stopover and depot for the Simla, the summer capital of the Raj. In 1846, it was transferred to the Shimla district and in 1899 to the Ambala district.
The main center part was established by Pundir Rajputs of Haryana and the area was under them and this town was governed by local Rajputi zamindars. In the 1800s, British occupied the land from local zamindars for rail development, which led to an economic boost of the town .
It became the junction for the Delhi-Panipat-Ambala-Kalka railway line, and the Kalka-Shimla railways (opened in 1903). By 1901, the town, administered as a notified area, had a population of 7,045, a railway workshop, and was a market for ginger and turmeric. The Kalka municipal committee was created on 11 April 1933.

Climate
Kalka experiences a subtropical climate, with a monsoon season from late June to early October. The summer starts in mid-April and temperatures peak during May and June. This is followed by the monsoon season, which is accompanied by a drop in temperature and an increase in humidity. Temperatures remain moderate in October and November, but start falling towards the end of November. Winter lasts through December, January and February, with temperatures lowest in early January. Kalka also receives some rainfall from Western Disturbance, near the end of winter. Winter season, despite being chilly, is mostly free of fog unlike most North Indian cities in the plains.

Transport

Road
Kalka is situated along a slope.  This makes it somewhat difficult to commute on foot.  Local transport (within Kalka) is by shared auto-rickshaws.  These autos ply to a distance of around 15–20 km. There are also shared cabs for distances up to 25–30 km. Government and private buses are also very common for commuting to nearby cities. Many intercity govt buses start or pass through Kalka, connecting it with Chandigarh, Ambala, Panipat, Delhi, Shimla and many other cities.

Rail
Kalka railway station is the northern terminal of the Delhi-Kalka line of Northern Railway, Indian Rail (Station code KLK) serving as terminal station for broad gauge line (towards Chandigarh) and narrow gauge line (towards Shimla). Direct trains on broad gauge, connect to Delhi, Mumbai, Howrah etc. In recent years, trains have been started from Kalka to Shirdi, Maharashtra and to Katra, Jammu which run on specific days of week.

Kalka Shimla Railway

The Kalka Shimla Railway features on the UNESCO's World Heritage Sites list. Work on the railway line started in 1898 and it opened for traffic in 1903.

Demographics

According to the 2011 census, the population of Kalka is 34,314. The Kalka Metropolitan area population is 86,550, which consists of the adjoining cities of Kalka, Pinjore and Parwanoo. Local language is Baghati but Punjabi, Haryanvi and Hindi is also used by the residents in the town.

Places of interest

Kalika Devi temple 

The ancient temple of the Hindu goddess Kali is situated on the National Highway 22 that runs through Kalka town. The temple is visited by devotees who pay their respects annually during the Navratri. According to oral tradition, the original temple was built by Pandavas of Mahabharata of Vedic era during their Agyatvas (exile) when they stayed here for some time.

Annual religious mela (fair) is held in March–April every year.

Shri Trimurtidham Balaji Hanuman Temple 

Sri Trimurti Dham is situated amidst the Shivalik Hills. It is located on a hill-top beside the eastern fringe of Kalka town in district. Panchkula (Haryana) overlooking the industrial city Parwanoo. The literal meaning of 'Sri Trimurti Dham' is "a place where Teen Murtis (three idols) exist together".

Shimla 
Shimla is situated in the south-western range of Himalayas. It is only 88 km from Kalka and can be reached in 2.5 hours by car.  Toy train is also ply from Shimla to Kalka, vice versa. It remains a favourite tourist destination of all throughout the year.

References

External links

Official Website of the Panchkula district
Panchkula district
Local web platform with information related to Kalka

Hindu temples in Haryana
Cities and towns in Panchkula district
Tehsils in Haryana
Hill stations in Haryana